Deraz Mahalleh may refer to:
 Deraz Mahalleh, Gilan
 Deraz Mahalleh, Mazandaran